Tamalia is a genus of aphids in the family Aphididae. There are about six described species in Tamalia.

Species
These six species belong to the genus Tamalia:
 Tamalia coweni (Cockerell, 1905) (manzanita leaf gall aphid)
 Tamalia dicksoni Remaudière & Stroyan, 1984
 Tamalia inquilina Miller, 2000
 Tamalia keltoni Richards, 1967
 Tamalia milleri Kanturski & Wieczorek, 2015
 Tamalia pallida Richards, 1967

References

Further reading

 
 

Aphids